Prikanalny is a rural locality (a settlement) in Marinovskoye Rural Settlement, Kalachyovsky District, Volgograd Oblast, Russia. The population was 184 as of 2010. There are 7 streets.

Geography 
Prikanalny is located 25 km east of Kalach-na-Donu (the district's administrative centre) by road. Marinovka is the nearest rural locality.

References 

Rural localities in Kalachyovsky District